The 37th New Zealand Parliament was a term of the New Zealand Parliament. It was elected at the 1972 general election on 25 November of that year.

1972 general election

The 1972 general election was held on Saturday, 25 November.

Sessions
The 37th Parliament sat for three sessions, and was prorogued on 10 October 1975.

Ministries
Norman Kirk formed the third Labour Government and led the Kirk Ministry until his sudden death on 31 August 1974. After Hugh Watt had been acting Prime Minister for the first few days of September 1974, Kirk was succeeded by Bill Rowling on 6 September.

Overview of seats
The table below shows the number of MPs in each party following the 1972 election and at dissolution:

Notes
The Working Government majority is calculated as all Government MPs less all other parties.

Initial composition of the 37th Parliament

Select committees
For the 37th Parliament, elected from the 1972 general election, there were the following select committees in the House of Representatives, as follows (Ministers of relevant portfolios are in bold):

By-elections during 37th Parliament
There was one by-election held during the term of the 37th Parliament.

Notes

References

37